Mama is an urban locality (a work settlement) and the administrative center of Mamsko-Chuysky District of Irkutsk Oblast, Russia. Population: 

Geography
Mama is located in the area of the Patom Highlands, at the confluence of the Mama and Vitim Rivers.

References

External links
Great Soviet Encyclopedia. Entry on Mama

Cities and towns in Irkutsk Oblast